Grayslake Community High School District 127 is a public high school district, with two schools: Grayslake Central High School and Grayslake North High School, located in Grayslake, Illinois. The district's enrollment is 2,970.

References

External links
 

School districts in Lake County, Illinois